Wildlife Warriors (subtitled It's Time) is a compilation album by Australian country music artist John Williamson. The album was released in November 2006 following the death of Steve Irwin and contains important environmental songs; many of which inspirations to Irwin. A$1 from each sale was donated to the Wildlife Warriors conservation foundation, a charity founded by Steve and Terri Irwin. Williamson said "[Steve] was a loud, proud Aussie who promoted the wonders of our ancient land with incredible enthusiasm. So if my new CD helps raise more awareness for the Wildlife Warriors' cause, that's great!"  The album includes two live recording from Irwin's memorial. The album, peaked at number 78 on the ARIA Charts.
The album was supported with a "Wildlife Warrior Tour" across Australia in 2007.

Track listing

Charts

Weekly charts

Year-end charts

Release history

References

2006 compilation albums
John Williamson (singer) compilation albums
EMI Records compilation albums